Mammy Two Shoes is a fictional character in MGM's Tom and Jerry cartoons. She is a heavy-set middle-aged African American woman who takes care of the house in which Tom and Jerry reside. Whether she is a housemaid or the owner of the house is never made clear, but the fact that she has her own bedroom in the short "Sleepy Tom" raises the possibility of her being the owner of the house, as no other human is present in the house in shorts she appears. She would scold and attack Tom whenever she believed he was misbehaving; Jerry would sometimes be the cause of Tom's getting in trouble.

As a partially-seen character, her head was rarely seen, except in a few cartoons including Part Time Pal (1947), A Mouse in the House (1947), Mouse Cleaning (1948), and Saturday Evening Puss (1950).

Mammy appeared in 19 cartoons, from Puss Gets the Boot (1940) to Push-Button Kitty (1952). Mammy's appearances have often been edited out, dubbed, or re-animated in later television showings, since her character is an archetype now usually considered racist. Her creation points to the ubiquity of the "mammy" stereotype in American popular culture, and the character was removed from the series after 1953 due to protests from the NAACP.

Theatrical Tom and Jerry cartoons

Mammy's debut appearance was in Puss Gets The Boot (1940), while her last appearance was in Push-Button Kitty (1952). She was originally voiced by well-known African-American character actress Lillian Randolph. She was the second prominent black character of the Metro-Goldwyn-Mayer cartoon studio, following Bosko. She appeared in 19 Tom and Jerry animated shorts between 1940 and 1952.

One of Mammy's roles in the films was to set up the plot by warning Tom that she will toss him out of the house if he failed to act according to her wishes. She invariably catches Tom acting against her orders, and there are grave consequences. Naturally, it is Jerry that sabotages Tom to get him in trouble. She always called Tom by his full name Thomas (originally Jasper), and almost always used is in place of are and am ("is you" and "I is"). Her signature quotes are "Land Sakes!" and "What in the world is going on in here?", the latter of which is usually delivered upon rushing in to investigate the commotion being caused by Tom and Jerry.

William Hanna and Joseph Barbera initially portrayed Mammy as the maid of the house, with the real owners unknown to audiences - at least, her apron suggests she is a maid. Later, Hanna and Barbera seemed to suggest, through dialogue and occasional behavior, that the house was Mammy's own. On one occasion, she goes to her bedroom. This suggests she owns the house and is its sole human occupant, though the cutting continuity filed with each short at the Library of Congress always referred to the character as "Maid."

Mammy Two-Shoes was retired from the Tom & Jerry cartoons by Hanna and Barbera following several years of protests and condemnations from the NAACP. A 1949 reissue of the 1943 short The Lonesome Mouse prompted the start of the NAACP's campaign against Tom & Jerry. In this short, Mammy is scared by Jerry onto a stool and shaken as a straight razor, dice, and other stereotypical props fall from beneath her dress.

In response to the NAACP's campaign and angry about the potential loss of acting roles, Lillian Randolph questioned the authority of then-NAACP president Walter White, stating that the light-complexioned White was "only one-eighth Negro and not qualified to speak for Negroes." When Randolph departed from Tom & Jerry to appear on television, Hanna and Barbera declined to recast the voice role and Mammy ceased to appear in the cartoons.

Censorship, discontinuation, and callbacks
Rembrandt Films produced 13 Tom and Jerry shorts and they were released from 1961 to 1962. Director Gene Deitch stated in an interview that he opted not to use Mammy's character in the 13 shorts, as he felt a "stereotypical black housekeep" character "didn't work in a modern context."

MGM Animation/Visual Arts, under the supervision of Chuck Jones, created replacement characters for Mammy in the Tom and Jerry cartoons featuring her for television. These versions used rotoscoping techniques to replace Mammy on-screen with a similarly stocky white woman (in most shorts) or a thin white woman (in Saturday Evening Puss); Randolph's voice on the soundtracks was replaced by an Irish-accented (or, in Puss, generic young adult) voice performed by actress June Foray.

Three years after Turner Broadcasting System acquired Tom & Jerry from MGM, the cartoons featuring Mammy were edited again. This time, Lillian Randolph's voice was replaced with that of Thea Vidale, who re-recorded the dialogue to remove Mammy's use of potentially offensive dialect. These re-recorded versions of the cartoons would air on Turner's Cartoon Network-related cable channels, and have at times turned up on DVD as well. However, some European TV showings of these cartoons, especially the UK, as well as the US DVD release of Tom and Jerry Spotlight Collection, Warner Bros. Home Entertainment Academy Awards Animation Collection, and Tom and Jerry: The Deluxe Anniversary Collection and the US DVD and Blu-ray releases of Tom and Jerry Golden Collection, retain Randolph's original voice. The Region 2 Complete Collectors Edition DVD boxset has Vidale's voice on the first DVD and Randolph in a number of the episodes after that (such as A Mouse in the House and Mouse Cleaning).

A white woman named "Mrs. Two-Shoes" appeared in some episodes of Tom and Jerry Tales. She had most aspects of Mammy Two Shoes's personality with a similar name, but without acts of animal cruelty.

Featured shorts

References

References

External References
 
 
 

African-American-related controversies
Animated human characters
Black characters in animation
Female characters in animation
Female characters in television
Fictional African-American people
Film characters introduced in 1940
Fictional maids
Self-censorship
Ethnic humour
Stereotypes of African Americans
Tom and Jerry characters
Television censorship
MGM cartoon characters
Unseen characters
Film controversies
African-American-related controversies in film
Race-related controversies in animation
Race-related controversies in television
Race-related controversies in film